Tokophrya is a genus of suctorians. An example is Tokophrya lemnarum.

References

Ciliate genera
Phyllopharyngea